The 1951 College Football All-America team is composed of college football players who were selected as All-Americans by various organizations and writers that chose College Football All-America Teams in 1951. The eight selectors recognized by the NCAA as "official" for the 1951 season are (1) the All-American Board (AAB), (2) the American Football Coaches Association (AFCA, (3) the Associated Press (AP), (4) the Football Writers Association of America (FWAA), (5) the International News Service (INS), (6) the Newspaper Enterprise Association (NEA), (7) the Sporting News and (8) the United Press (UP).

Consensus All-Americans
For the year 1951, the NCAA recognizes eight published All-American teams as "official" designations for purposes of its consensus determinations. The following chart identifies the NCAA-recognized consensus All-Americans and displays which first-team designations they received.

All-American selections for 1951

Ends
 Bill McColl, Stanford (College Football Hall of Fame) (AAB; AFCA; APO-1; FWO-1; INSO-1; NEAO-1; SN; UP-1; CP-1; CTO-1; WC-1)
 Bob Carey, Michigan State (AAB; APO-1; NEAO-1; SN; UP-1; CP-1; WC-1)
 Pat O'Donahue, Wisconsin (APD-1; FWD-1; NEAD-1)
 Billy Howton, Rice (AFCA; APO-2; CP-3; CTO-1)
 Frank McPhee, Princeton (FWD-1 INSD-1; UP-2; CP-3)
 Dewey McConnell, Wyoming (APD-1; NEAD-1)
 Stan Williams, Baylor (FWO-1)
 Leo Sugar, Purdue (APD-2; CTD-1)
 Eddie Bell, Penn (APD-2; INSD-1)
 Doug Atkins, Tennessee (CTD-1)
 Tom McCann, Holy Cross (APO-2)
 Jim Mutscheller, Notre Dame (UP-2)
 Lowell Perry, Michigan (UP-3; CP-2)
 Ed Barker, Washington State (UP-3)
 Hal Faverty, Wisconsin (CP-2; INSO-1)

Tackles
 Don Coleman, Michigan State (College Football Hall of Fame) (AAB; AFCA; APO-1; FWO-1; INSO-1; NEAO-1; SN; UP-1; CP-1; CTO-1; WC-1)
 Jim Weatherall, Oklahoma (College Football Hall of Fame) (AAB; AFCA; APD-1; FWD-1; INSD-1; NEAO-1; SN; UP-1; CP-1; WC-1)
 Pug Pearman, Tennessee (APD-1; FWD-1; NEAD-1; UP-2; CP-3)
 Bob Toneff, Notre Dame (APO-1; UP-2; CP-2)
 Jack Little, Texas A&M (FWO-1)
 Chuck Ulrich, Illinois (INSO-1)
 Bill George, Wake Forest (CTO-1)
 Doug Conaway, Texas Christian (NEAD-1)
 Lamar Wheat, Georgia Tech (UP-3; INSD-1)
 Dick Modzelewski, Maryland (College Football Hall of Fame) (APD-2; CTD-1)
 Tom Johnson, Michigan (CTD-1)
 Ollie Spencer, Kansas (APO-2)
 Bob Werckle, Vanderbilt (APO-2)
 Hal Mitchell, UCLA (CP-2)
 John Feltch, Holy Cross (CP-3)
 Jerrell Price, Texas Tech (APD-2)

Guards
 Bob Ward, Maryland (College Football Hall of Fame) (AAB; AFCA; APO-1; FWD-1; INSO-1; NEAO-1; SN; UP-1; CTO-1; WC-1)
 Les Richter, California (College Football Hall of Fame) (AAB; APD-1; FWD-1; INSO-1; SN; UP-1; CP-1; CTO-1, CTD-1; WC-1)
 Ray Beck, Georgia Tech (College Football Hall of Fame) (AFCA; APD-1; FWO-1; NEAD-1; UP-3; CP-1; CTD-1)
 Joe Palumbo, Virginia (College Football Hall of Fame) (APD-1; NEAO-1)
 Ted Daffer, Tennessee (APD-2; INSD-1; NEAD-1; UP-2; CP-2)
 Marv Matuszak, Tulsa (APO-1)
 Nick Liotta, Villanova (FWO-1; CTD-1 (linebacker))
 Chet Millett, Holy Cross (FWD-1)
 George Mrkonic, Kansas (INSO-1)
 Jim Donarski, Arizona (APO-2)
 Norm Manoogian, Stanford (APO-2)
 John Michels, Tennessee (UP-3)
 Harley Sewell, Texas (College Football Hall of Fame) (CP-3)
 Gerald Audette, Columbia (CP-3)
 Bill Athey, Baylor (APD-2)

Centers
 Dick Hightower, Southern Methodist (SMU) (AAB; AFCA; APO-2; INSO-1; SN; UP-1; CP-1; CP-1; CTO-1; WC-1)
 Pat Cannamela, USC (APD-2; UP-2; FWD-1; INSD-1 (center); NEAD-1; CP-2 (guard))
 Doug Moseley, Kentucky (APO-1; FWO-1; UP-3; CP-3)
 Keith Flowers, Texas Christian (APD-1; CTD-1)
 Chuck Boerio, Illinois (UP-2 (center); NEAD-1)
 George Tarasovic, LSU (NEAO-1)
 Charlie Harris, California (CP-2)
 Donn Moomaw, UCLA (College Football Hall of Fame) (APD-2; UP-3)

Quarterbacks
 Babe Parilli, Kentucky (AAB; APO-2; UP-1; CP-1; INSD-1; SN; NEAO-1 (QB); CTO-1 (QB); WC-1)
 Larry Isbell, Baylor (APO-1; UP-3; FWO-1; CP-2; INSD-1)
 Gary Kerkorian, Stanford (UP-2; CP-3; INSD-1)
 Al Dorow, Michigan State (INSD-1)
 Bill Wade, Vanderbilt (APO-2)

Halfbacks
 Dick Kazmaier, Princeton (Heisman Trophy and College Football Hall of Fame) (AAB; AFCA; APO-1; FWO-1; INSO-1; NEAO-1 (HB); SN; UP-1; CP-1; CTO-1 (HB); WC-1)
 Hank Lauricella, Tennessee (College Football Hall of Fame) (AAB; AFCA; APO-1; FWO-1; INSO-1; NEAO-1 (HB); SN; UP-1; FWO-1; CP-1; CTO-1 (HB); WC-1)
 Johnny Karras, Illinois (AFCA; AAB; APO-2; FWO-1; SN; UP-1; CP-1; WC-1)
 Ed Modzelewski, Maryland (APO-2; UP-3; CP-2; INSO-1)
 Bobby Dillon, Texas (APD-1; FWD-1 (halfback); NEAD-1 (safety); CTD-1)
 Al Brosky, Illinois (APD-1; FWD-1 (safety))
 Harry Agganis, Boston U. (NEAD-1 (def. halfback))
 Jim Ellis, Michigan State (CTD-1)
 Avatus Stone, Syracuse (CTD-1)
 Johnny Bright, Drake (College and Canadian Football Hall of Fame) (UP-2; CP-3)
 Vic Janowicz, Ohio State (College Football Hall of Fame) (APD-2; UP-2; CP-2)
 Veryl Switzer, Kansas State (APD-2)
 Jim Dooley, Miami (APD-2)

Fullbacks
 Ollie Matson, San Francisco (College and Pro Football Hall of Fame) (APD-1; UP-2; FWD-1 (def. halfback); CP-2; INSO-1; NEAD-1 (def. halfback)
 Hugh McElhenny, Washington (Pro and College Football Hall of Fame) (APO-1; UP-3; CP-3; NEAO-1 (FB); CTO-1 (FB))
 Frank Gifford, USC (Pro and College Football Hall of Fame) (AFCA; UP-3; CP-3)

Key

Official selectors

Other selectors

See also
 1951 All-Big Seven Conference football team
 1951 All-Big Ten Conference football team
 1951 All-Pacific Coast Conference football team
 1951 All-SEC football team

Notes

References

All-America Team
College Football All-America Teams